The  was held on 8 March 1992 in Kannai Hall, Yokohama, Kanagawa, Japan.

Awards
 Best Film: A Scene at the Sea
 Best New Actor: Sabu – World Apartment Horror
 Best Actor: Hidekazu Akai – Ōte
 Best Actress: Jun Fubuki – Munō no Hito
 Best New Actress:
Hiroko Oshima – A Scene at the Sea
Hikari Ishida – Chizuko's Younger Sister, Aitsu, My Soul Is Slashed
 Best Supporting Actor: Koji Matoba – Shishiōtachi no Natsu, No Worries on the Recruit Front
 Best Supporting Actress:
Emi Wakui – My Sons, No Worries on the Recruit Front
Reona Hirota – Ōte, Yumeji
 Best Director: Takeshi Kitano – A Scene at the Sea
 Best New Director: Naoto Takenaka – Munō no Hito
 Best Film Score:  Joe Hisaishi – A Scene at the Sea, Chizuko's Younger Sister
 Best Screenplay: Toshiharu Marūchi – Munō no Hito
 Best Cinematography: Akihiro Itō – Ōte
 Best Art Direction: Noriyoshi Ikeya – Yumeji
 Special Jury Prize: Katsuhiro Ōtomo – World Apartment Horror – For succeeding in making animation film as well as feature film.

Best 10
 A Scene at the Sea
 Munō no Hito
 Ōte
 Rainbow Kids
 Chizuko's Younger Sister
 World Apartment Horror
 Kaze, Slow Down
 My Sons
 Yumeji
 Shishiōtachi no Natsu
runner-up. Nakibokuro

References

Yokohama Film Festival
1992 film festivals
1992 in Japanese cinema
Yoko
March 1992 events in Asia